Kaun Apna Kaun Paraya is a 1963 Hindi film starring Waheeda Rehman in the lead role. After a shipwreck, a woman adopts a boy who survived the disaster just like her. He grows up to become an engineer and is all set to marry his boss's daughter. Soon his real mother enters the picture.

Soundtrack
All lyrics by Shakeel Badayuni.

References

External links

1963 films
1960s Hindi-language films
Films scored by Ravi